The Durfee House is a historic building that now serves as student housing for Hobart and William Smith Colleges in Geneva, New York. It was originally built downtown as a land speculator's office during the nascence of European takeover of Native American territory in the region. Dated to 1787, it is the oldest known extant structure in Geneva and the surrounding area; however, the building was moved to its present location at 639 South Main Street in 1838 and expanded at least once in its history, in the late 1790s and/or in the 1840s. This hinders its historical landmark eligibility, despite the fact that it is considered to be one of the oldest extant frame buildings west of Rome, New York. Owned by Hobart College since 1840, the building is named for mathematician and dean William Pitt Durfee.

See also
Geneva Hall and Trinity Hall, Hobart & William Smith College

References

Bibliography

Geneva, New York
Hobart and William Smith Colleges
Commercial buildings completed in 1787
Houses completed in 1787
Buildings and structures in Ontario County, New York
History of New York (state)
1787 establishments in New York (state)